Iridomyrmex infuscus is a species of ant in the genus Iridomyrmex. Described by Heterick and Shattuck in 2011, the species is known only from a single specimen collected in the Australian Capital Territory.

Etymology
The species name derives from the Latin language, which translates as 'dark brown' or 'blackish', in reference to the species appearance.

References

Iridomyrmex
Hymenoptera of Australia
Insects described in 2011